Boleslav Pachol (born 10 May 1948) is a Czech weightlifter. He competed in the men's flyweight event at the 1976 Summer Olympics.

References

1948 births
Living people
Czech male weightlifters
Olympic weightlifters of Czechoslovakia
Weightlifters at the 1976 Summer Olympics
Sportspeople from Karviná